The seventh series of Dancing on Ice aired from on 8 January to 25 March 2012 on ITV. Phillip Schofield returned as presenter, but Holly Willoughby was replaced by Christine Bleakley. Jayne Torvill and Christopher Dean returned to mentor the celebrities, with Karen Barber returning as head coach. This series was judged by The Ice Panel by Louie Spence, Robin Cousins and Katarina Witt. Spence and Witt joined The Ice Panel as replacements for former judges, Jason Gardiner and Emma Bunton. The show moved back to its original location of Elstree Studios, which was used during the show's first five series, but still used the same layout as introduced in last series.

Couples
On 24 January 2012, it was revealed that the 12 remaining couples would be going head-to-head in individual skating battles, where each couple were paired up and take to the ice at the same time performing their own routine to the same song. The Ice Panel then decided out of the pairs which couple they thought skated best (they did not score but still commented), automatically guaranteeing them a place in the following weeks show. At the end of the battles the six that were not chosen faced the public vote, where one left the competition.

Matthew and Nina emerged victorious at the end of the series on 25 March 2012, with Jorgie and Matt finishing as runners up and Chico and Jodeyne coming in third place.

Scoring chart

Green scores indicate the highest skating score of the week.
Red scores indicate the lowest skating score of the week.
 indicates the couple eliminated that week
 indicates the returning couple that were saved from the Skate-off
 indicates the winning couple
 indicates the runner-up couple
 indicates the third-place couple
"—" indicates the couple that did not skate that week

Average score chart 
This table only counts for dances scored on a traditional 30-point scale (the duel skate from week 4 and the doubled scores from week 9 are not included).

Live show details

Results summary
Colour key

 After the judges' scores and viewer votes were combined in the usual way, the bottom three (Chemmy, Sébastien and Heidi) had to take part in an "Ultimate Skills" skate-off. They would have to skate a one-minute routine in which they had display 23 skills without the aid of their professional partner. After each celebrity had skated the judges gave comments and then head judge Robin had to decide which celebrity he wanted to save.

Week 1 (8 January)

Judges' votes to save
Spence: Heidi & Andrei
Witt: Andy A & Maria
Cousins: Heidi & Andrei

Week 2 (15 January)
Guest performance: "Kiss the Stars" – Pixie Lott

Judges' votes to save
Spence: Corey & Brooke
Witt: Corey & Brooke
Cousins: Corey & Brooke

Week 3 (22 January)
Theme: Movie

Judges' votes to save
Spence: Charlene & Matthew
Cousins: Charlene & Matthew
Witt: Charlene & Matthew

Week 4 (29 January)
This was a special "Duel" show.  Two couples skated simultaneously to each song, of which the judges voted to give one couple immunity from the public vote.  The public then voted among the remaining six couples.
Guest performance: "Jar of Hearts" – Christina Perri

Judges' votes to save
Witt: Charlene & Matthew
Cousins: Corey & Brooke
Spence: Charlene & Matthew

Week 5 (5 February)

Theme: Pop Week
Guest performance: "What Makes You Beautiful" and "One Thing" – One Direction 

Judges' votes to save
Spence: Sam & Alexandra
Cousins: Sam & Alexandra
Witt: Sam & Alexandra

Week 6 (12 February)

Theme: Valentine's Day

Judges' votes to save
Cousins: Chemmy & Sean
Spence: Chemmy & Sean
Witt: Chemmy & Sean

Week 7 (19 February)
Theme: Ultimate Skills Test
Required elements:
Step sequence
Unassisted jump
Spin on one foot with at least two rotations

Week 8 (26 February)
Theme: Rock Week
Guest performance: "Don't Stop Believin' – "The cast of Rock of Ages

Judges' votes to save
Spence: Chico & Jodeyne
Cousins: Chico & Jodeyne
Witt: Chico & Jodeyne

Week 9 (4 March)

Theme: Team Challenge
 Team Jorgie: "Spice Up Your Life" – Spice Girls
 Team Matthew: "YMCA" – The Village People

Judges' votes
Spence
Team Challenge: Team Matthew
To save: Chemmy & Sean
Cousins
Team Challenge: Team Jorgie
To save: Chemmy & Sean
Witt
Team Challenge: Team Jorgie
To save: Chemmy & Sean

Week 10 (11 March)
Theme: Prop Week at the Circus
Guest performance: "Seven Nation Army" – Marcus Collins

Judges' votes to save
Witt: Chemmy & Sean
Spence: Chico & Jodeyne
Cousins: Chico & Jodeyne

Week 11 (18 March)
Theme: Solo Challenge - Ultimate Skills Test

Judges' votes to save
Spence: Jorgie & Matt
Cousins: Jorgie & Matt
Witt: Jorgie & Matt

Week 12: Final (25 March)
Theme: Showcase routine; favourite routine of the series; Boléro
Special musical guests: "Boléro" (lyrical version) – Laura Wright and Noah Stewart

Ratings 
Viewing figures from BARB.

References

External links
Dancing on Ice at ITV.com

2012 British television seasons
Series 07